The 1958–59 Cincinnati Bearcats men's basketball team represented University of Cincinnati. The head coach was George Smith.

Regular season
In the Crosstown Shootout, Cincinnati beat Xavier by a score of 92–66. The match was held at the Cincinnati Gardens.

NCAA basketball tournament
Midwest 
Cincinnati 77, Texas Christian 73
Cincinnati 85, Kansas State 75
Final Four
California 64, Cincinnati 58
Third-place game
Cincinnati 98, Louisville 85

Awards and honors
 Oscar Robertson, USBWA College Player of the Year, NCAA scoring leader (2x)

NBA draft

References

Cincinnati
Cincinnati Bearcats men's basketball seasons
NCAA Division I men's basketball tournament Final Four seasons
Cincinnati Bearcats men's basketball team
Cincinnati Bearcats men's basketball team